Ilkhchi is a city in East Azerbaijan Province, Iran.

Ilkhchi or Ilkhechi, also rendered as Ilchi or Ilkhchih or Ilikhchi, may also refer to various places in Iran:
 Ilkhchi, Germ, Ardabil Province
 Ilkhchi, Kowsar, Ardabil Province
 Ilkhchi-ye Olya, Ardabil Province
 Ilkhchi-ye Sofla, Ardabil Province
 Ilkhechi, Hashtrud, East Azerbaijan Province
 Ilkhchi District, in East Azerbaijan Province
 Ilchi-ye Bala, Hormozgan Province

See also
 Qeshlaq-e Ilkhchi (disambiguation)